Bergen Big Band (BBB) is a Norwegian big band established 1991 as a continuation of Knut Kristiansen's Bergen Band. BBB is known from cooperations with musicians like Phil Woods, Paquito D'Rivera, Joe Henderson, Maria Schneider, Diana Krall, Sissel Kyrkjebø, Andy Sheppard, Martial Solal, Mathias Rüegg, Gianluigi Trovesi, Mathias Eick, Ole Kock Hansen, Etta Cameron, Karin Krog, John Surman, Dino Saluzzi, Gustavo Bergalli, Berit Opheim, Jan Magne Førde, The Core, Ab und Zu, Vidar Johansen, Paolo Vinaccia, Ståle Storløkken, Palle Mikkelborg and Terje Rypdal among others.

Biography 

Olav Dale was musical leader of the band the entire period 1991-2014. In 1995, BBB, Nattjazz and Vossajazz made an agreement to make an annual project with the band over a three-year period. The collaboration has continued thereafter. In 1999, the West Norwegian Jazz Center took over as administrative leaders of the band.

In 2005 they released the studio album Seagull, with Karin Krog conducted by John Surman. In 2007 they released the album Meditations on Coltrane, from a concert at Nattjazz featuring The Core, the same year. Crime Scene (2010) recorded at Nattjazz 2910, featuring Terje Rypdal, Palle Mikkelborg, Ståle Storløkken and Paolo Vinaccia, at the ECM label.

November 2, 2004 the band was joined by Karin Krog and John Surman, for a memorial concert for the bands late leader Olav Dale at USF, Verftet in Bergen.

Current members 

Woodwinds
 Elisabeth Lid Trøen
 Jan Kåre Hystad
 Ole Jakob Hystad
 Zoltan Vincze
 Michael Barnes

Trumpets
 Martin Winter
 Svein Henrik Giske
 Are Ovesen
 Reid Gilje

Trombones
 Øyvind Hage
 Sindre Dalhaug
 Pål Roseth
 Kjell Erik Husom

Rhythm section
 Ole Thomsen guitar
 Thomas T. Dahl guitar
 Dag Arnesen piano
 Magne Thormodsæter bass
 Frank Jakobsen drums

Honors 
 2015: First Olav Dale's Memorial Award

Discography

Albums 
2003: Adventures In European New Jazz And Improvised Music (Europe Jazz Oddysey), with Mathias Rüegg "Art & Fun" on compilation with various artists
2005: Seagull (Grappa Music), feat. Karin Krog condcted by John Surman recorded at the Nattjazz Festival, Bergen 2004
2007: Meditations on Coltrane (Grappa Music), with The Core
2008: Som den gyldne sol frembryter (Grappa Music)
2010: Crime Scene (ECM Records), with Terje Rypdal recorded at the Nattjazz Festival, Bergen 2009
2014: Another Sky (Grappa Music), with John Surman
2016: Kuria Suite (Grappa Music), with Knut Kristiansen
2017: Norwegian Song IV (Odin Records|Odin), with Dag Arnesen

Contributors

Notes

External links
Knut Kristiansen + Bergen Big Band Jazzklubben NRK.no

Big bands
Norwegian jazz ensembles
ECM Records artists
Grappa Music artists
Musical groups established in 1991
1991 establishments in Norway
Musical groups from Bergen